Teixeiranthus is a genus of Brazilian plants in the tribe Eupatorieae within the family Asteraceae.

Species
The only known species is Teixeiranthus foliosus, native to the States of Bahia and Minas Gerais in eastern Brazil.
formerly included
see Ageratum 
Teixeiranthus pohlii - Ageratum pohlii

References

Eupatorieae
Endemic flora of Brazil
Monotypic Asteraceae genera